Nursultan Bimurza (born ) is a Kazakhstani volleyball player. He is part of the Kazakhstan men's national volleyball team. On club level he plays for Atyrau Vc.

References

External links
 profile at FIVB.org

1994 births
Living people
Kazakhstani men's volleyball players
Place of birth missing (living people)
21st-century Kazakhstani people